Miss South Africa is a national beauty pageant in South Africa that selects South African representatives to compete in two of the Big Four international beauty pageants, Miss World and Miss Universe, and also selects another representative to participate in minor international pageant Miss Supranational. The Miss South Africa organisation resorted to a contemporary format in selecting representatives which was inaugurated in 2018. Following their newer method, both a Miss World South Africa and a Miss Universe South Africa were selected as representatives. From 2021 onwards, the winner of Miss South Africa will be competing in Miss Universe, Miss World and Miss Supranational. The current Miss South Africa 2022 is Ndavi Nokeri.

History

Established in 1956 in Apartheid South Africa, the first official Miss South Africa pageant was only open to "white" (Caucasian) females and was organized to send a representative to London for the Miss World pageant. That year Norma Vorster was crowned Miss South Africa. Two years later, an 18-year-old secretary from Durban, Penny Coelen, was crowned and would later go on to make history and win Miss World.
It was not until 1977 that all persons of all races were allowed to compete in the Miss SA competition. Prior to that, people of colour competed in the Miss Africa South pageant, which was renamed Miss Black South Africa in 1977.

This was just the beginning for the Miss South Africa organisation; of the 60 women who have worn the crown, only the last 27 winners have been chosen from the entire population of South Africa and not just white individuals. Since then, hundreds of young women have entered the pageant vying for the title.

Miss South Africa (or a runner-up in some instances) has always competed at Miss World, but the first Miss South Africa to compete at Miss Universe was Kerishnie Naicker in 1998.

Prior to 1998, South Africa's representatives at Miss Universe qualified via other national pageants.

Three Miss South Africas, namely Rolene Strauss, Anneline Kriel and Penelope Coelen, have won the Miss World titles in 2014, 1974 and 1958 respectively. Three women from South Africa have won the title of Miss Universe - Margaret Gardiner in 1978, Demi-Leigh Nel-Peters in 2017 and Zozibini Tunzi in 2019.

Prior to the establishment of the official Miss South Africa, South African Pictorial ("The Union's National Weekly") held annual Beauty Competitions starting in 1923.  This evolved later into Miss South Africa.  The first winner of this prize was Mrs. Doris Ferramosca (née Doris Gwendoline Helliwell).

In 2020, Miss South Africa franchised the Miss Supranational license. In 2022, Miss South Africa 2021, Lalela Mswane became the first South African woman have won the title of Miss Supranational.

List of Miss South Africa Winners

 First Black Miss South Africa

 First Indian Miss South Africa

*Assumed title after winner won global pageant or as a result of winners resignation.

International crowns

 
 Three – Miss Universe winners: 
Margaret Gardiner (1981)
Demi-Leigh Nel-Peters (2017)
Zozibini Tunzi (2019)

 Three – Miss World winners: 
Penelope Coelen (1958)
Anneline Kriel (1974)
Rolene Strauss (2014)

 One – Miss Supranational winner: 
Lalela Mswane (2022)

Hosts
Richard Steinmetz
Bonang Matheba
ProVerb
Anele Mdoda
Nico Panagio

Titleholders

Titleholders under Miss South Africa org.

The following women have represented South Africa in two of the Big Four major international beauty pageants for women. These are Miss World and Miss Universe; Miss International and Miss Earth are held by separate national beauty pageants in South Africa.

Miss Universe South Africa

On some occasions, the winner of Miss South Africa represents her country at the Miss Universe pageant. Prior to 1982, the winner of the Miss RSA pageant represented South Africa at Miss Universe. Prior to 1998, the winner of the individual Miss Universe South Africa compete at Miss Universe. From 1981-1983 and in 1979, delegates from two of South Africa's Bantustans competed at Miss Universe.

Miss World South Africa

On some occasions, the winner of Miss South Africa represents her country at the Miss World pageant. From 1970 to 1976, South Africa had one white and one black representative at Miss World. The white representative wore a sash that said "South Africa" and the black representative wore a sash that said "Africa South".

Miss Supranational South Africa 
Miss South Africa Organisation held the Miss Supranational franchise in 2020 and send 1st runner-up, Thato Mosehle. From 2021 onwards, the winner of Miss South Africa will be competing in Miss Universe, Miss World and Miss Supranational when her schedule permits or won any of the international title.

See also
Miss Earth South Africa
Miss South Africa 2014

References

Notes

External links

Official Miss South Africa website

 

 
South Africa
South Africa
South Africa
South Africa
Recurring events established in 1956
1956 establishments in South Africa
South African awards